The 1936 Idaho gubernatorial election was held on November 3. Vying for an open seat, Democratic nominee Barzilla Clark defeated Republican nominee Frank Stephan with 57.19% of the vote.

Three-term incumbent governor C. Ben Ross opted to run for the U.S. Senate against its dean, Republican William Borah, who won a sixth term.

Primary elections
Primary elections were held on August 11, 1936.

Democratic primary

Candidates
Barzilla Clark, Idaho Falls mayor
G. P. Mix, Moscow, lieutenant governor
Bert Miller, St. Anthony, attorney general
W.P. Whitaker, Pocatello
Franklin Girard, Coeur d'Alene, secretary of state
George Meffan, Nampa, U.S. Marshal
Asher Wilson, Twin Falls
Frank Martin, Boise

Republican primary

Candidates
Frank Stephan, Twin Falls
L. V. Patch, Payette
T. B. Chapman, Boise

General election

Candidates
Major party candidates
Barzilla Clark, Democratic
Frank Stephan, Republican 

Other candidates
V. A. Verhei, Union

Results

References

1936
Idaho
Gubernatorial